was a town in Higashiyamanashi District, Yamanashi Prefecture, Japan.

As of 2003, the town had an estimated population of 9,271 and a density of 255.82 persons per km². The total area was 36.24 km².

On November 1, 2005, Katsunuma, the city of Enzan, and the village of Yamato (also from Higashiyamanashi District), were merged to create the city of Kōshū.

Katsunuma is also popular for white wines.

See also
 Japanese wine
 Battle of Kōshū-Katsunuma

References

External links
 Kōshū official website 

Dissolved municipalities of Yamanashi Prefecture
2005 disestablishments in Japan